The Hanyu dazidian is a reference work on Chinese characters.

Overview
A group of more than 400 editors and lexicographers began compilation in 1974, and it was published in eight volumes from 1986 to 1989. A separate volume of essays documents the lexicographical complexities for this full-scale Chinese dictionary. Besides the weighty 5,790-page first edition, there are 3-volume (1995) and pocket editions.  A second edition (pictured at right) was published in 2006, and has a list of radicals printed on the dust jacket of each volume for quicker character look up.

The first edition of the Hanyu dazidian included 54,678 head entries for characters, and this was expanded to 60,370 in the second edition, published in 2010. They give historical logographic forms such as oracle bone script, bronzeware script, and seal script. Pronunciation is glossed for Old Chinese (Shijing rhyme group), Middle Chinese (fanqie spelling), and Modern Standard Chinese (pinyin). The chronologically numbered definitions cite early Chinese dictionaries (especially the Shuowen Jiezi) and classic texts. Internal collation is by a 200 radical system, arranged by stroke count. Volume 8 has appendices, including rime tables for Old and Middle Chinese, variant characters, indexes, and addenda.

The Hanyu dazidian has become the international standard reference for Chinese characters; for example, the Unihan Database and Wiktionary cite (volume/page/entry) references.

See also
Dai Kan-Wa jiten
Han-Han Dae Sajeon
Hanyu Da Cidian
Kangxi Zidian
Zhonghua Da Zidian

References

Further reading
 Sin, Chow Yiu 单周尧, 2001. 《汉语大字典》札记九则 ("Notes on Hanyu dazidian"). In Yuyuan Jijin, pp. 108–113. Shanghai Jiaoyu Chubanshe.

External links
Sichuan Lexicographical Press page: 2nd edition
Chongwen shuju page: 2nd edition 

Chinese dictionaries